"We Can Have It All" is a song by British DJ and record producer Danny Byrd, featuring Tori Beaumont. It is the third single released from his third studio album Rave Digger. The song was released on 24 October 2010 as a digital download and 12" vinyl on 22 November 2010. The single debuted at number 22 on the UK Dance Chart and later at number 144 on the UK Singles Chart.

Track listings

Chart performance

Release history

References

2010 singles
Danny Byrd songs
2010 songs
Songs written by Danny Byrd
Hospital Records singles